The Tenji period is a brief span of years during the Asuka period of Japanese history.  The Tenji period describes a span of years which were considered to have begun in the 1322nd year of the Yamato dynasty.

The timespan is the same as the reign of Emperor Tenji, which is traditionally considered to have been from 662 through 672.

Periodization
The  adoption of the Sexagenary cycle calendar (Jikkan Jūnishi) in Japan is attributed to Empress Suiko in 604; and this Chinese calendar continued in use throughout the Tenji period.

However, after the reign of Emperor Kotoku, this method of segmenting was temporarily abandoned or allowed to lapse. This interval continued during the Tenji period.

Neither the years of Emperor Tenji's reign nor the Tenji period are included in the list nengō for this explicit  duration of time, which comes after Hakuchi and before Suchō.

In the post-Taika or pre-Taihō chronology, the first year of Emperor Tenji's reign (天智天皇元年 or 天智天皇1年) is also construed as the first year of the Tenji period (天智1年).

Non-nengō period
Non-nengō periods in the pre-Taihō calendar were published in 1880 by William Bramsen. These were refined in 1952 by Paul Tuschihashi in Japanese Chronological Tables from 601 to 1872.

The pre-Tahiō calendar included two non-nengō gaps or intervals in the chronological series:
Taika, August 645–February 650.
Hakuchi, February 650–December 654.
Non-nengō dating systems
Shuchō, July–September 686.
Non-nengō dating systems
Taihō, March 701–May 704.
Nengō were not promulgated (or were allowed to lapse) during the gap years between Hakuchi and Shuchō, and in another gap between Shuchō and Taihō.

Events of the Tenji period
 662 (Tenji 1):  Empress Saimei dies; and her nephew delays receiving the succession (senso).  Only years later does Emperor Tenji formally accede to the throne (sokui).
 662 (Tenji 1): A new chronological time frame is marked by the beginning of the reign of Emperor Tenji
 667 (Tenji 6): Six years after the death of Empress Saimei, her mausoleum was reconstructed.  Naka no Ōe-shinnō had not yet been proclaimed as Emperor Tenji, which meant that he had not yet begun to create an official court around himself.  In this year, he did at last establish his court at Ōtsu-no-Miya in the Ōmi Province, where his enthronement was belatedly scheduled for the springtime of the following year.
 668 (Tenji 7):  Emperor Tenji is formally enthroned.

See also
 Jinshin War
 Regnal name
 List of Japanese era names

Notes

References
 Bramsen, William. (1880). Japanese Chronological Tables: Showing the Date, According to the Julian or Gregorian Calendar, of the First Day of Each Japanese Month, from Tai-kwa 1st year to Mei-ji 6th year (645 AD to 1873 AD): with an Introductory Essay on Japanese Chronology and Calendars. Tokyo: Seishi Bunsha. OCLC 35728014
 Brown, Delmer M. and Ichirō Ishida, eds. (1979).  Gukanshō: The Future and the Past. Berkeley: University of California Press. ;  OCLC 251325323
 Murray, David. (1894). The Story of Japan. New York, G.P. Putnam's Sons.  OCLC 1016340
 Nussbaum, Louis-Frédéric and Käthe Roth. (2005).  Japan encyclopedia. Cambridge: Harvard University Press. ;  OCLC 58053128
 Ponsonby-Fane, Richard Arthur Brabazon. (1959).  The Imperial House of Japan. Kyoto: Ponsonby Memorial Society. OCLC 194887
 Titsingh, Isaac. (1834). Nihon Odai Ichiran; ou,  Annales des empereurs du Japon.  Paris: Royal Asiatic Society, Oriental Translation Fund of Great Britain and Ireland. OCLC 5850691
 Tsuchihashi, Paul Yashita, S.J. (1952). .  Tokyo: Sophia University. OCLC 001291275
 Varley, H. Paul. (1980). A Chronicle of Gods and Sovereigns: Jinnō Shōtōki of Kitabatake Chikafusa. New York: Columbia University Press.  ;  OCLC 6042764
 Zöllner, Reinhard. (2003). Japanische Zeitrechnung: ein Handbuch Munich: Iudicium Verlag. ;  OCLC 249297777

External links
 National Diet Library, "The Japanese Calendar" -- historical overview plus illustrative images from library's collection

Japanese eras
7th century in Japan
662 beginnings
672 endings